Marit Törnqvist (born January 19, 1964) is a Swedish-Dutch author, artist and illustrator. She was best known for her illustrations in the books of Astrid Lindgren.

Life and career 
Marit Törnqvist is the daughter of Egil Törnqvist, a professor of Scandinavian Studies at the University of Amsterdam and an academic literary critic. Her mother is author and translator Rita Törnqvist Verschuur.

Törnqvist moved to the Netherlands at the age of five, where she still lives today. Her mother translated the books of Astrid Lindgren into Dutch. Thus, Törnqvist grew up with Lindgren's literature.

From 1982 to 1987 Törnqvist went to the Gerrit Rietveld Academy in Amsterdam. In 1989 Marit Törnqvist illustrated her first book The Christmas Carp (Swedish: Julkarpen) with her mother. They created it after a visit to Prague during the Christmas season.

At the same time Törnqvist applied in Sweden as an illustrator and the publishing house Raben & Sjögren in Stockholm asked her not only to make the illustrations to the Christmas Carp but also to make a picturebook with Astrid Lindgren. Her first Lindgren book was published in 1989 När Bäckhultarn for till stan. She soon worked closely with the Swedish author and made several books with her.

In 1995, Törnqvist wrote and illustrated the book A Small story about Love (Swedish: Liten berättelse om kärlek). In 1996, it was awarded with the Dutch literary prize Zilveren Griffel.

Törnqvist has two daughters. She professionally and privately supports refugees.

Works (selection)

As an illustrator

Illustrated Astrid Lindgren books 
 A Calf for Christmas (När Bäckhultarn for till stan, 1989)
 The Day Adam Got Mad (När Adam Engelbrekt blev tvärarg, 1991)
 In the Land of Twilight (I skymningslandet, 1994)
 The Red Bird (Sunnanäng, 2003)
 The Story Journey From Junedale to Nangilima (Sagoresan, 2006)
 Alla ska sova (2019)

Further works 
 The Christmas Carp (Julkarpen, 1989, together with her mother Rita Törnqvist Verschuur)
 Bigger than a dream (Större än en dröm, 2013, author: Jef Aerts)
 Jij bent de herrste (2014, authors: Hans Hagen and Monique Hagen)
 Helden op sokken (1988, author: Annie Keuper-Makkink)
 Een verhaal voor Hizzel (1994, author: Klaas van Assen)

As an author 
 Small Story about love (Liten berättelse om kärlek, 1995)
 Blowing bubbles in Burundi (Bellen blazen in Burundi, 2007)
 What nobody expected (Wat niemand had verwacht, 2009)
 Charlie's Magical Carnival (2014)
 The island of happiness (Het gelukkige eiland, 2016

Awards and nominations

Awards 
Zilveren Griffel
 1996: Small Story about love
 2018: Het gelukkige eiland

Gouden Penseel
 2006: Pikkuhenki

Boekenpauw
 2018: Het gelukkige eiland

Nominations 
Hans Christian Andersen Award
 2016: short list

Astrid Lindgren Memorial Award
 2009, 2010, 2011, 2012, 2013, 2014, 2015, 2016, 2017, 2018, 2019

References 

1964 births
Living people
People from Uppsala
Swedish illustrators
Artists from Amsterdam
Swedish emigrants to the Netherlands
Swedish fantasy illustrators
20th-century Dutch women artists
21st-century Dutch women artists
20th-century Swedish women artists
21st-century Swedish women artists
Boekenpauw winners
Gouden Penseel winners